Enzenauer is a German surname. Notable people with the surname include:

Peter Enzenauer (1878–1951), Canadian politician
Ute Enzenauer (born 1965), West German cyclist

German-language surnames